Marcin Wachowicz (born February 14, 1981 in Choszczno) is a Polish football striker who last plays for Ruch Radzionków.

Career
In October 2010, he moved to Ruch Radzionków from Arka Gdynia. He was released in January 2011.

References

External links
 

1981 births
Living people
Polish footballers
Polonia Warsaw players
Czarni Żagań players
Ząbkovia Ząbki players
Hutnik Warsaw players
Ceramika Opoczno players
ŁKS Łódź players
Lech Poznań players
Arka Gdynia players
Ruch Radzionków players
Ekstraklasa players
People from Choszczno County
Sportspeople from West Pomeranian Voivodeship
Association football forwards